Federico Acuña  (born 25 March 1985) is a Paraguayan football centre-back. He currently plays for Tacuary F.B.C.

Career 
Acuña started his playing career in 2004 with Sportivo Luqueño. In 2005, he joined General Caballero, and in 2006, he transferred to Tacuary.

In 2007, Acuña joined Vélez Sársfield of the Argentine Primera for a trial period that lasted the whole pre-season. However, he was not signed by Vélez and instead joined Gimnasia y Esgrima de Jujuy. He returned to Paraguay to play for Guaraní in 2009.

External links
Argentine Primera statistics 
Federico Acuña at BDFA

1985 births
Living people
Paraguayan footballers
Paraguayan expatriate footballers
Association football defenders
Argentine Primera División players
Primera Nacional players
Paraguayan Primera División players
Sportivo Luqueño players
General Caballero Sport Club footballers
Club Tacuary footballers
Club Atlético Vélez Sarsfield footballers
Gimnasia y Esgrima de Jujuy footballers
Club Guaraní players
Club Atlético 3 de Febrero players
Sport Colombia footballers
Sportivo Carapeguá footballers
Guaraní Antonio Franco footballers
Deportivo Capiatá players
General Díaz footballers
Club Sol de América footballers
Expatriate footballers in Argentina
Paraguayan expatriate sportspeople in Argentina